St. Thomas' Church School, Howrah founded between 1860 and 1865, by Rev. Dr. William Spencer, Chaplain of St. Thomas' Church, for education of Anglo-Indian children of Howrah, is one of the largest and most famous schools in Howrah, India. The school admits children of all sections of society irrespective of caste, creed or religion. It falls under the Diocese of Calcutta of the Church of North India.

History
The church has a marble font, which had been presented to commemorate John Stalkart of Ghoosery who was a member of the Church for over sixty years. The stained glass windows forming a backdrop to the altar, depict the tragic grandeur of Christ's crucifixion and have survived the test of time.

Campus
The campus covers an area of 6 Bighas or 18 Kathas. It comprises two main buildings (for Junior Section, classes lower nursery to five & Senior Section, classes six to twelve), an auditorium, a basketball court, two open playgrounds & a children's park exclusive to the students of the junior divisions. The building comprises classrooms, a library, laboratories for Physics, Chemistry, Biology & Computing and staff rooms. Both the principal's and vice-principal's office happens to be near the senior school buildings. There are two main entrances into the school, both of which are operated to ensure easiness for the students.

School Terms
The school year consists of two-terms. The first term extends from mid-April to mid-September and the second term from October to March.  In these terms are three vacations - Summer, Durga-Puja and Winter (Christmas). After the end of second term (after annual examination) the school is suspended from mid-March to mid-April.

Subjects
After the eighth standard, there is a division in study stream with the choices being Commerce and Science. After tenth standard school offers three streams to students being science, commerce and humanities. Choices in science being science with biology or computer. There is also a division in Commerce and the choices are Mathematics or Business studies.

Notable alumni
 Cliff Richard - Singer
 Manoj Tiwary - Indian National cricketer, also plays for the Kolkata Knight Riders in IPL.
 Ayaz Ahmed - Actor in daily soaps based on MTV & Channel V

See also
Education in India
List of schools in India
Education in West Bengal

References

Church of North India schools
Christian schools in West Bengal
Primary schools in West Bengal
High schools and secondary schools in West Bengal
Private schools in Kolkata
Schools in Howrah district
Education in Howrah
Educational institutions established in 1865
1865 establishments in India